Holly Springs is the name of some places in the United States of America:

Holly Springs, Arkansas
Holly Springs, Georgia 
Holly Springs, Mississippi
Holly Springs, North Carolina
Holly Springs Township, Wake County, North Carolina
Holly Springs, Surry County, North Carolina
Holly Springs, South Carolina
Holly Springs National Forest
Mount Holly Springs, Pennsylvania